Ondřej Pažout  (born 1 July 1998) is a Czech Nordic combined skier who competes internationally.

He competed at the 2018 Winter Olympics. He also competed at the 2022 Winter Olympics.

References

External links

1998 births
Living people
Czech male Nordic combined skiers
Olympic Nordic combined skiers of the Czech Republic
Nordic combined skiers at the 2018 Winter Olympics
Nordic combined skiers at the 2022 Winter Olympics
People from Turnov
Nordic combined skiers at the 2016 Winter Youth Olympics
Sportspeople from the Liberec Region